Nanny is a BBC television series that ran between 1981 and 1983. In this historical drama, Wendy Craig stars as nanny Barbara Gray, caring for children in 1930s England. When Barbara Gray leaves the divorce court she has no money and no job—just an iron will and a love for children. The third series is set in London during World War II.

All three series were commercially released in the UK on a complete series box-set on the 22nd of May 2017.

References

External links
 

1981 British television series debuts
1983 British television series endings
BBC television dramas
1980s British drama television series
Television series set in the 1930s
Television series set in the 1940s
Television shows set in London
Fictional nannies